Baloji (born 12 September 1978) is a Belgian rapper, MC and hip hop artist of Congolese origin. Known as MC Balo in the hip hop group Starflam, he continued as solo artist starting 2004.

Career
Beginnings with Starflam

Born out of wedlock to a Belgian father and a Congolese mother, he moved to Belgium with his father to live in Ostende losing all contact with his mother. Feeling estranged in his new environment and after disputes with his father and petty crimes and problems with police, he quit home and lived in a youth delinquent house working on his passion of rap and dance. Alongside his friends, he started the hip hop band Starflam at age 15. The band's self-titled debut album in 1998 was Starflam and the follow-up album Survivant released on Capitol / EMI in 2001 went platinum and was rereleased with a Survivant - Édition Spéciale in EMI the following year. In 2003, the band had yet another studio album Donne moi de l'amour. But after differences with the other members of the band, Baloji quit music in 2004.

Solo
After Baloji discovered a letter from his mother that he hadn't seen since 1981, and after winning a poetry competition in Paris, France, he decided to return to music in 2006 as a solo artist. His debut solo album in 2008 entitled Hotel Impala was an autobiographical album about his life, including a hearty response to his mother's letter. The album was certified gold, with the album winning two "Octaves de la musique" awards as well as Rapsat-Lelièvre Award and Brassens Awards for Lyricists. He followed it up with albums Kinshasa Succursale in 2011 and 64 Bits and Malachite in 2015.

Discography

Albums
As part of Starflam

 1998: Starflam [Discipline Records / Rough Trade]
 2000: Live & Direct [Warner Music Benelux]
 2001: Survivant [Capitol/EMI]
2002: Survivant - Édition Spéciale (EMI)
 2003: Donne moi de l'amour [Hostile/EMI]
2004: Donne moi de l'amour - Édition Deluxe (EMI)

Solo
2008: Hotel Impala
2011: Kinshasa Succursale
2015: 64 Bits and Malachite
2018: 137 Avenue Kaniama

Maxis and singles
As part of Starflam
1997: "Corde raide" [12", Discipline Records]
1998: Ce plat pays II [12" & CD, Discipline Records]
2000: Bled runner [12" & CD, Warner Music Benelux]
2001: "De cause à effet" / "Ca tape dur" [12", Capitol / EMI]
2001: La Sonora [12 & CD, Capitol / EMI]
2001: Amnésie Internationale [12" & CD, Capitol / EMI]
2002: Sous pression [12" & CD, Capitol / EMI]
2003: "Marseille – Liège" / "Mr Orange" [12", Hostile / EMI]
2003: "Ils ne savent pas" [12", Hostile / EMI]

Featured in
2015: "La vie est belle / Life is Beautiful" (Petite Noir feat. Baloji)

Filmography

References

External links
Official website

1978 births
Living people
People from Lubumbashi
Belgian rappers
Democratic Republic of the Congo film directors
Democratic Republic of the Congo songwriters
Democratic Republic of the Congo musicians
Democratic Republic of the Congo actors
Democratic Republic of the Congo producers
21st-century Democratic Republic of the Congo people
Democratic Republic of the Congo emigrants to Belgium
Belgian film directors
Belgian male singer-songwriters
21st-century Belgian male musicians
21st-century Belgian male actors
Belgian producers
Democratic Republic of the Congo rappers